The following is a list of episodes of reality television series American Chopper: Senior vs. Junior, the spin-off of American Chopper. Starting December 13, 2010, the show moved to Discovery Channel. and ended.

Series overview 
Even though the American Chopper: Senior vs. Junior spin-off series retained its own season numbering scheme (seasons 1–4), it maintained the American Chopper season numbering continuation (seasons 7–10).

{| class="wikitable plainrowheaders" style="text-align:center"
|-
! colspan="2" rowspan="2" style="width: 50pt;" | Overallseason
! rowspan="2" style="width: 50pt;" | Spin-offseason
! rowspan="2" style="width: 50pt;" | Episodes
! colspan="2" | Originally aired
|-
! style="width: 125pt;" | Season premiere
! style="width: 125pt;" | Season finale
|-
| bgcolor="#FF6229" style="width: 10pt;" |
| 7
| [[List of American Chopper: Senior vs. Junior episodes#Season 1 (2010–2011)|1]]
| 18
| 
| 
|-
| bgcolor="#979797" style="width: 10pt;" |
| 8
| [[List of American Chopper: Senior vs. Junior episodes#Season 2 (2011)|2]]
| 21
| 
| 
|-
| bgcolor="#55FFFF" style="width: 10pt;" |
| 9
| [[List of American Chopper: Senior vs. Junior episodes#Season 3 (2012)|3]]
| 13
| 
| 
|-
| bgcolor="#008000" style="width: 10pt;" |
| 10
| [[List of American Chopper: Senior vs. Junior episodes#Season 4 (2012)|4]]
| 15
| 
| 
|-
|}

Episodes

Season 1 (2010–2011) 
The season one mid-season continuation was preceded by a special episode on November 29, 2010, titled "A Family Divided" where Paul Sr, Paul Jr, and Mikey reflect on how their family got to the dysfunctional state it is today. Certain segments about the family from past episodes are shown and the Teutuls are interviewed. Another special titled "A Crew Divided" premiered on January 3, 2011, where both production crews from Orange County Chopper and Paul Jr. Designs opened up about how they feel on the feuding Teutuls.

Season 2 (2011) 
On February 7, 2011, Paul Teutul Jr. announced that American Chopper: Senior vs. Junior had been renewed for a second season.

Season 3 (2012)

Season 4 (2012) 
Note: This season dropped the Sr. vs. Jr. subtitle and returned to the original American Chopper title.

Specials

See also 
 List of Orange County Choppers episodes

References

External links 
 
 
 

2010 American television seasons
2011 American television seasons
American Chopper
Lists of American non-fiction television series episodes
Lists of American reality television series episodes